Kaestlea is a genus of skinks. These skinks are small, shiny, smooth-scaled species. They are diurnal, terrestrial and insectivorous. They lay eggs to reproduce. These skinks are identified by their distinct blue tail colour. They live in tropical rainforest and montane forest habitats. These secretive skinks silently move through thick leaf-litter on forest floor. They are all endemic to the Western Ghats mountains  and in some parts of Eastern Ghats (Shevaroys)  of South India.

Species
The following 5 species, listed alphabetically by specific name, are recognized as being valid:

Kaestlea beddomii (Boulenger, 1887) - Beddome's ground skink
Kaestlea bilineata (Gray, 1846) -  two-lined ground skink
Kaestlea laterimaculata (Boulenger, 1887)
Kaestlea palnica (Boettger, 1892) - Palni Hills ground skink
Kaestlea travancorica (Beddome, 1870) - Travancore ground skink

Nota bene: A binomial authority in parentheses indicates that the species was originally described in a genus other than Kaestlea.

References

 
Lizard genera
Endemic fauna of India
Taxa named by Valery Konstantinovich Eremchenko
Taxa named by Indraneil Das